Anna of Saxe-Wittenberg (died: 18 April 1426) was a member of the House of Ascania and the wife of Duke Frederick I of Brunswick-Lüneburg, a German anti-king.

Anna of Saxe-Wittenberg was the daughter of Duke Wenceslas I of Saxe-Wittenberg, Duke of Lüneburg and Elector of Saxony and his wife Cecilia of Carrara.

In 1386 she married with Duke Frederick I of Brunswick-Lüneburg.  They had two daughters.  In 1400 Frederick was elected King of the Germans.  This election, however, was not recognized by three of the electors.  Frederick was murdered on the way home, a month after the election.

Anna's second marriage was with Landgrave Balthasar of Thuringia, Margrave of Meissen.  This marriage remained childless.

Issue 
From her first marriage to Frederick I, Duke of Brunswick-Lüneburg she had two daughters:
 Catherine (died before 1439), married Henry XXIV, Count of Schwarzburg-Sondershausen
 Anna (1390–1432), married in 1410 Duke  Frederick IV, Duke of Austria, "of the Empty Pockets" of Austria, a Tyrollean Count

Ancestors

References 
 Brigitte Sokop: Stammtafeln europäischer Herrscherhäuser, 3rd ed., Vienna, 1993

House of Ascania
House of Wettin
14th-century births
Year of birth uncertain
1426 deaths
Duchesses of Saxony
Duchesses of Saxe-Wittenberg
Duchesses of Brunswick-Lüneburg
Margravines of Meissen
Old House of Brunswick
Daughters of monarchs
Remarried royal consorts